WXBJ-LP (94.1 FM) is a radio station licensed to serve the community of Salisbury, Massachusetts. The station is owned by Good Neighbor Station Inc. It airs an oldies format.

The station was assigned the WXBJ-LP call letters by the Federal Communications Commission on February 10, 2014.

References

External links
 Official Website
 

XBJ-LP
XBJ-LP
Radio stations established in 2014
2014 establishments in Massachusetts
Oldies radio stations in the United States
Essex County, Massachusetts